John Magnus (born May 10, 1997) is an American soccer player who currently plays college soccer at the University of Washington.

Career
Magnus has been part of the Seattle Sounders FC Academy since 2012.  On February 6, 2015, it was announced that Magnus signed a letter of intent to play college soccer at the University of Washington.  However, he did not join the Huskies as he continued to play for the Sounders U18's.  On August 28, he made his professional debut for Seattle Sounders FC 2 in a 2–1 defeat to Real Monarchs.

On February 3, 2016, Magnus would once again sign to play college soccer at the University of Washington, joining fellow academy teammates Kasey French and Handwalla Bwana.

References

External links
U.S. Soccer Development Academy bio

1997 births
Living people
American soccer players
Washington Huskies men's soccer players
Tacoma Defiance players
Association football midfielders
Soccer players from Washington (state)
USL Championship players
People from Snohomish, Washington